Msheireb Museums is a project by Msheireb Properties which celebrates the histories of four historic heritage houses in the heart of Msheireb Downtown Doha, the capital city of Qatar.

Msheireb Museums are an integral part of the inner city's regeneration of the old commercial centre, with its traditional community-based lifestyle. The restoration of the four heritage houses—Bin Jelmood House, Company House, Mohammed Bin Jassim House and Radwani House—into world-class museums is a vital part of the Msheireb Downtown Doha development.

The Msheireb Museums are part of the first phase of the Heritage Quarter of Msheireb Properties’ QR20 billion (US$5.5 billion), 310,000 sq m development.

Houses

Bin Jelmood House 
Bin Jelmood House charts the history of the global slave trade, particularly in the Indian Ocean region, and the changes caused by its abolition.

Certain sections of the house are dedicated to the narration of the trade in enslaved people throughout the Indian Ocean, a vast region of which the countries of the Persian Gulf are a part of. Additionally, the house sheds light on the historic importation of slaves from Zanzibar to dive for pearls on behalf of their Qatari owners.

Company House
This house recounts the history of the pioneering petroleum industry workers and their families whose work helped to transform Qatar.

Mohammed Bin Jassim House 
Originally built by Sheikh Mohammed bin Jassim Al Thani, the son of the Qatar's founder, the Mohammed bin Jassim House focuses on the past, present and sustainable elements of the vast Msheireb Downtown Doha. It also houses the Echo Memory Art Project using objects uncovered during demolition of the site.

Radwani House
The Radwani House was first built in the 1920s. This house is located between Al Jasrah and Msheireb, two of Doha's oldest quarters.

Location

Msheireb Museums are located on Mohammed Bin Jassim Street, Doha, Qatar (adjacent to the Aimiri Diwan).

References

Doha
Museums in Qatar